World Press Freedom Canada (sometimes known as the Canadian Committee for World Press Freedom) is a Canadian not for profit organisation that campaigns for media freedom and journalist safety. 

It issues the annual press freedom award.

Organization 
World Press Freedom Canada was  founded by Spencer Moore and incorporated as a not for profit in 2008,The organization advocates for press freedom and the safety of journalists. The organisation was previously, and sometimes still is, known as the Canadian Committee for World Press Freedom and is a successor to Ottawa’s National Press Club. The Ottawa Press Club faced financial challenges in 2003, filing for bankruptcy protection in July 2003.

In 2021, World Press Freedom Canada's president was Shawn McCarthy.

History 
In 2014, the organization organized an event to fundraise for Mohamed Fahmy, an Egyptian-Canadian journalist who was being detained in Egypt and who later won the 2015 Press Freedom prize.

In 2021, the organization was critical of Royal Canadian Mounted Police's activities during the 2020 Canadian pipeline and railway protests.

Awards 
World Press Freedom Canada organises and issues the Press Freedom award and the Spencer Moore awards, which were started by the predecessor organisations.

The organisation also organises an annual competition between editorial cartoonists.

Annual award

Spencer Moore Award for Lifetime Achievement

See also 

 Reporters without Borders and their Press Freedom Index
 World Press Freedom Day

References

External links 

 Official website

2008 establishments in Ontario
Organizations established in 2008
Organizations based in Ottawa
Freedom of the press
Freedom of expression organizations
Journalism organizations